Andong Station is a railway station on the Jungang Line and formerly the Gyeongbuk Line.

As of December 17th 2020, the location of Andong Station has changed from downtown (adjacent to the Nakdong River) to near the edge of town (next to Andong Bus Terminal).

External links
 Station information from Korail

Railway stations in North Gyeongsang Province
Andong
Railway stations opened in 1930
Cultural Heritage of early modern times of South Korea